Francesca Durante (born 12 February 1997) is an Italian professional footballer who plays as goalkeeper for Serie A club Inter Milan and the Italy women's national team.

International career 
She made her first appearance for Italy on 6 December 2015 in a 2–0 loss against China.

References

External links 
 

Living people
1997 births
Italy women's international footballers
Inter Milan (women) players
Italian women's footballers
Women's association football goalkeepers
Fiorentina Women's F.C. players
ACF Firenze players
Serie A (women's football) players
Hellas Verona Women players
UEFA Women's Euro 2022 players